The Nlakaʼpamux or Nlakapamuk, also previously known as the Thompson, Thompson River Salish, Thompson Salish, Thompson River Indians or Thompson River people, and historically as the Klackarpun, Haukamaugh, Knife Indians, and Couteau Indians, are an Indigenous First Nations people of the Interior Salish language group in southern British Columbia.  Their traditional territory includes parts of the North Cascades region of Washington.

Other names

Frontier-era histories and maps transliterate the name Nlakaʼpamux as Hakamaugh or Klackarpun; they were also known as the Kootomin, or Couteau (Knife). or Knife Indians.  In the dialect of the Thompson language used by the Ashcroft Indian Band, the variant Nlʼakapxm is used.

The Nlakaʼpamux of the Nicola Valley, who are all in the Nicola Tribal Association reserves refer to themselves as Scwʼexmx and speak a different dialect of the Thompson language.  Together with the Spaxomin people, a branch of the Okanagan people (Syilx) who live in the upper Nicola valley and also belong to the Nicola Tribal Association, they are collectively known as the Nicola people, or Nicolas.

Ethnobotany
Blueberries (Vaccinium myrtilloides) are traditionally used by them in pies. They have used the leaves of sedge (Carex) as brushes for cleaning and also as forage for their livestock.

Religion
The Nlakaʼpamux were the object of both Anglican and Roman Catholic missionary efforts in the nineteenth century, resulting in the vast majority belonging to one of the two denominations by the beginning of the twentieth century.

Governments
The Nlakaʼpamux Nation Tribal Council despite its name does not include all Nlakaʼpamux people, but is one of two main tribal bodies within the region, the other being the  Nicola Tribal Association.  The Lytton First Nation or Lytton Band, focussed on the town of the same name, which is named Camchin or Kumsheen in the Nlakaʼpamux language and is one of the largest Nlakaʼpamux communities, does not belong to any of the three tribal associations. While the Upper Nicola Band is affiliated with the Scwʼexmx Tribal Council it is a Syilx community and part of the Okanagan Nation Alliance it is not Nlakaʼpamux and has a different traditional territory than the other Nlakaʼpamux Bands.

None of the Nlakaʼpamux governments are in the British Columbia Treaty Commission process at present.

Nlakaʼpamux Nation Tribal Council
Boothroyd Indian Band
Boston Bar Indian Band
Oregon Jack Creek Indian Band
Spuzzum Indian Band
Lytton Indian Band
Skuppah Indian Band

Scwʼexmx Tribal Council (Originally Nicola Tribal Association or NTA) 

Shackan Indian Band (Original NTA)
Nooaitch Indian Band (Original NTA)
Upper Nicola Band (Original NTA)(A member of the Okanagan Nation Alliance)
Coldwater Indian Band (Original NTA)
Lower Nicola Indian Band (Affiliated)

Unaffiliated
Ashcroft Indian Band
Kanaka Bar Indian Band
Siska Indian Band
Cook's Ferry Indian Band
Nicomen Indian Band (Former member of the Fraser Canyon Indian Administration)

Language
The Nlakaʼpamux speak an Interior Salishan language named , usually transliterated as Nlakaʼpamuxtsn  and known in English as the Thompson language.  The Scwʼexmx of the Nicola Valley speak a dialect also called Scwʼexmx.

Notable people
G. A. Grisenthwaite, writer
Kevin Loring, writer
Terese Marie Mailhot, writer
Sharon McIvor, activist
Ilona Verley, drag queen and make-up artist
Annie York, writer

See also
Scwʼexmx
Sxeʼxnʼx

Notes

Bibliography
 Thompson River Salish Dictionary
Compiled by Laurence C. Thompson and M. Terry Thompson
 They Write Their Dreams on the Rock Forever: Rock Writings in the Stein River Valley of British Columbia (with Chris Arnett and Richard Daly
 Spuzzum: Fraser Canyon Histories, with Andrea LaForet
 Historical Atlas of British Columbia and the Pacific Northwest, Derek Hayes, Cavendish Books, Vancouver (1999) ISBN
 The Resettlement of British Columbia: Essays on Colonialism & Geographical Change, University of British Columbia Press; New Ed edition (January 1997) ISBN
 
 NLakaʼpamux Language CD by Barbara Joe(2005){Editor/Producer/Technical: Dr. Shawn E. Swakum D.D}
 Shackan Stories by Jim Toodlican(2006){Editor/Producer/Technical: Shawn E. Swakum D.D}

 
Interior Salish
Native American history of Washington (state)